The Nidd Valley Railway was a  long single-track branch railway line that ran along the valley of the River Nidd in North Yorkshire, England.

History
The proposal to drive a railway into Nidderdale was first mooted by the Leeds & Thirsk Railway Company when they were constructing their line. Parliamentary authority was granted, but they allowed the powers to lapse and in 1860, the North Eastern Railway (who had been granted authority in 1859) started constructing the line instead. It opened to traffic on 1 May 1862. The railway stayed on the north side of the River Nidd, (save a short stretch between Darley and Dacre stations) and was mostly uphill towards Pateley Bridge.

Stations
Upon opening the line had three intermediate stations: Killinghall (renamed first to Ripley in 1862, and then to Ripley Valley in 1875), Birstwith, and Dacre, with Darley opening in 1864 and Hampsthwaite opening in 1866.

Initially, services for passengers on the line amounted to four out and back workings per day between Harrogate and Pateley Bridge. By 1923, this was seven a day, but this tally fell back again when by the 1950s, only two services in each direction were working the line.

All stations on the line had goods facilities, with the exception of Hampsthwaite, which was for passengers only, and actually closed a year earlier to passengers than the other stations on the line (2 January 1950). Goods traffic was mixed; inbound was mostly coal and construction traffic (especially for transfer over to the Nidd Valley Light Railway) for the reservoir building schemes in Upper Nidderdale. Grain traffic to the flour mill at Birstwith continued up to closure of the line.

Closure
After the traffic on the Nidd Valley Light Railway ceased, passenger numbers and through freight traffic on the branch declined. In addition, a bus service between Harrogate and Pateley Bridge with stops in the villages was more convenient for many residents than a walk to the station. The last scheduled passenger train ran on 31 March 1951 but the line remained open for goods until 30 October 1964. The last branch goods working was pulled by J27 0-6-0 No 65894.

The old line northwards from Harrogate to Ripley has been converted into a bridleway for walkers, horses and cyclists as Nidderdale Greenway. The entire line up to Pateley Bridge (and beyond on the Nidd Valley Light Railway), has also been proposed to be converted into a greenway.

Nidd Valley Light Railway

References

Sources

External links

Brief line history and route plan
Line on a 1948 OS Map

Closed railway lines in North East England
Rail transport in North Yorkshire
Railway lines opened in 1862
Nidderdale
1862 establishments in England
North Eastern Railway (UK)